The 2008 ADAC-Zurich 24h-Rennen Nürburgring was the 36th running of the 24 Hours of Nürburgring. It took place on 25 May 2008.

The #1 Manthey Racing team won the race in a Porsche 911 GT3 R.

Race results
Class winners in bold.

Started, result unknown

References

External links
 

Nurburgring
Nürburgring 24 Hours